Satoo is a residential neighbourhood in the Mill Woods area of the City of Edmonton, Alberta, Canada.  Satoo is one of three neighbourhoods in the Mill Woods community of  Knottwood.

It is bounded on the north by 23 Avenue, on the south by Anthony Henday Drive, on the west by 91 Street, and on the east by 80 Street and Mill Woods Road West.

Satoo is named for a Cree chief, Satoo. Between 1876 and 1891, the Papachase Indian reserve was located in the Mill Woods area.

Demographics 

Residential development 
The neighbourhood is popular with young families, with roughly three out of ten residents in the neighbourhood being under the age of 20.  Just under one in ten residents is over the age of 65, the age traditionally considered retirement age.

According to the 2005 Municipal Census, approximately three out of four residences were single-family dwelling with the remainder being a mixture of duplexes and row houses.  Most residences were built during the 1970s.  Roughly four out of every five private dwellings are owner-occupied with the remainder being rented.  The average number of persons per household is 3.1.

Dan Knott Junior High School and Satoo Elementary School, both operated by the Edmonton Public School System are located in Satoo.

Surrounding neighbourhoods

References

External links 
City of Edmonton neighbourhood profile

Neighbourhoods in Edmonton